Ilya Leonidovich Aleksiyevich (born 10 February 1991) is a Belarusian professional football player who plays for Gomel.

Career
Aleksiyevich made his debut for the senior national team of his country on 14 November 2012, in a friendly match against Israel.  He had previously competed for Belarus at the 2012 Summer Olympics.

Honours
Gomel
Belarusian Cup winner: 2010–11, 2021–22
Belarusian Super Cup winner: 2012

BATE Borisov
Belarusian Premier League winner: 2013, 2014, 2015 
Belarusian Super Cup winner: 2013, 2014

International goal

References

External links
 
 

1991 births
Living people
People from Zhodzina
Sportspeople from Minsk Region
Belarusian footballers
Association football midfielders
Belarus international footballers
Olympic footballers of Belarus
Footballers at the 2012 Summer Olympics
Belarusian expatriate footballers
Expatriate footballers in Greece
FC Torpedo-BelAZ Zhodino players
FC Gomel players
FC BATE Borisov players
Panetolikos F.C. players
FC Shakhtyor Soligorsk players
FC Minsk players
FC Krumkachy Minsk players